St. John's Academy may refer to:

Canada
 St. John's Academy, Shawnigan Lake, British Columbia

Philippines

 St. John's Academy of Bataan, Dinalupihan, Bataan
 St. John's Academy, Onse, San Juan, Metro Manila

United Kingdom
 St. John's Academy, an 18th-century school, now St John's House Museum, Warwick
 St. John's Academy, in Marlborough, Wiltshire
 St John's Academy, Perth, Scotland

United States
 St. John's Military Academy, now part of Chaminade College Preparatory School in Chatsworth, Los Angeles, California
 St. John's Academy, associated with Church of St. John the Baptist in Burlington, Iowa
 A former part of St. John's College in Winfield, Kansas
 St. John's Academy, in Hillsdale, New Jersey

 A former name of The Manlius School, Manlius, New York

 A school in the former St. James Basilica in Jamestown, North Dakota
 A former name of Seton Catholic High School in Pittston, Pennsylvania
 A former school in Darlington, South Carolina
 St. John's Academy (Alexandria, Virginia)

 St. John's Northwestern Military Academy, Delafield, Wisconsin

See also
 Saint John's College (disambiguation)
 St. John's High School (disambiguation)
 St. John's School (disambiguation)